Conrad Magnusson (August 18, 1874 – September 14, 1924) was an American tug of war athlete who competed in the 1904 Summer Olympics. In the 1904 Olympics he won a gold medal as a member of the Milwaukee Athletic Club team.

References

External links
Conrad Magnusson's profile at databaseOlympics
Conrad Magnusson's profile at Sports Reference.com

1874 births
1924 deaths
Olympic gold medalists for the United States in tug of war
Olympic tug of war competitors of the United States
Tug of war competitors at the 1904 Summer Olympics
Medalists at the 1904 Summer Olympics